Daniel McCoy (July 17, 1845November 6, 1908) was a Michigan politician.

Early life and education
Daniel McCoy was born on July 17, 1845 in Philadelphia, Pennsylvania to parents John and Mary Ann McCoy. There, he received a public school education. In 1867, McCoy moved to Romeo, Michigan.

Career

Once in Michigan, McCoy began a grain business which furnished supplies to the lumbering regions of Michigan. In 1872, McCoy sold out this business and took to lumbering on the south branch of the Manistee River. In 1873, McCoy settled in the village of Clam Lake, which is now the city of Cadillac, where he continued his lumbering business for ten years. While there, McCoy ended up holding the positions of village president of Clam Lake, and later mayor of Cadillac. In 1883, McCoy moved to Grand Rapids, Michigan. There, in 1886, he organized the Edison Light Company. In 1892, he organized the State Bank of Michigan. McCoy served as Michigan State Treasurer from 1901 to 1904. In 1905, McCoy was appointed a member of the Pioneer Society of the State of Michigan. That same year, McCoy was appointed by Michigan Governor Fred M. Warner, along with Lawton T. Hemans and Arthur Holmes, to be the commissioners to relocate the remains of the first governor of Michigan, Stevens T. Mason, from New York Marble Cemetery in New York City to Capitol Park in Detroit so that they may be reinterned there. Governor Mason's remains arrived in Detroit on June 4, 1905.

Personal life
In 1879, McCoy married Abigail Lyon Ayers. Together, they had at least one child.

Death
McCoy died on November 6, 1908 in Grand Rapids. There, he was interred in Oakhill Cemetery.

References

1845 births
1908 deaths
People from Cadillac, Michigan
People from Romeo, Michigan
Politicians from Grand Rapids, Michigan
Politicians from Philadelphia
Mayors of places in Michigan
Michigan Republicans
State treasurers of Michigan
19th-century American politicians
20th-century American politicians
Burials in Michigan
19th-century American businesspeople